Archibald Ferguson (9 December 1918 – 19 March 1998) was a Scottish footballer who played as a goalkeeper.

Career
Ferguson signed for Raith Rovers at 19, however his professional career there was cut short due to the outbreak of World War II, and the suspension of the football leagues in the UK.

During the war, Ferguson guested for Bolton Wanderers and Doncaster Rovers.

Ferguson would sign for Doncaster Rovers after the war in 1946, making 61 appearances for the club.

In 1949, Ferguson would move to Wrexham, where he would spend 4 years and met his future wife.

In 1953 Ferguson would move back to Scotland with Dunfermline Athletic, making 1 appearance before retiring.

References

1918 births
1998 deaths
Scottish footballers
Association football goalkeepers
Raith Rovers F.C. players
Doncaster Rovers F.C. players
Wrexham A.F.C. players
Dunfermline Athletic F.C. players
Bolton Wanderers F.C. wartime guest players
Doncaster Rovers F.C. wartime guest players
English Football League players